The following is the list of film, television and theatre credits for American actress, singer, and author Lea Michele. Michele came to worldwide prominence after being cast in the main role of Rachel Berry in the Fox musical comedy-drama series Glee (2009–15). Before global fame, Michele acted on Broadway, originating the role of Wendla Bergmann in the rock musical Spring Awakening (2006–08). As a child actress, she appeared in Les Misérables as Young Cosette, and the Broadway revival of Ragtime as the Little Girl.

Michele made her film debut in the ensemble romantic comedy New Year's Eve (2011). Michele then voiced the main character Dorothy Gale in the animated film Legends of Oz: Dorothy's Return (2014). She then starred as Hester Ulrich in Fox's horror-comedy series Scream Queens (2015–16). Michele  portrayed Valentina Barrella in the ABC sitcom The Mayor (2017–18). In July 2019, Michele was cast as Olivia Henderson in the ABC's tv movie Same Time, Next Christmas.

Film

Television

Stage

Music videos

References

External links
 
 
 

Credits
Actress filmographies
American filmographies